Ralph Richard "Blackie" Schwamb (August 6, 1926 – December 21, 1989) was an American professional baseball pitcher and convicted murderer. He played for the St. Louis Browns of Major League Baseball in 1948.

Biography
Schwamb was nicknamed "Blackie" while in grade school, due to his habit of wearing black clothing, a practice he adopted after watching Western movies and seeing the "bad guys" wearing black. He served in the United States Navy during World War II, receiving a bad conduct discharge after hitting an officer.

Schwamb first played in the minor leagues from 1947 to 1949; initially in the Arizona–Texas League and Northern League (both Class C) and later the American Association (Triple-A) and Southern Association (Double-A). In 1948, Schwamb pitched in 12 major league games (five starts) for the St. Louis Browns, recording one win and one loss, while compiling an 8.53 earned run average (ERA). His lone win came in his second start, when he pitched  innings at home against the Washington Senators while allowing six runs (five earned) on eight hits, benefitting from his team scoring seven runs in the bottom of the sixth inning. Schwamb had three hits in 10 major league at bats and scored one run.

After the 1948 season, Schwamb killed a doctor in Long Beach, California, named Donald Buge. Schwamb did it to pay off a debt to a Los Angeles mobster, Mickey Cohen. Schwamb was sentenced to life in prison in 1949, but was granted parole in 1960.

In 1961, Schwamb played a final season of minor league baseball, for the Hawaii Islanders of the Pacific Coast League. Overall, in four seasons of professional baseball, Schwamb pitched in 62 games while compiling a 13–15 record with a 4.44 ERA. His life is the subject of a 2005 book entitled Wrong Side of the Wall.

References

Further reading
 Introduction of Wrong Side of the Wall: The Life of Blackie Schwamb, the Greatest Prison Baseball Player of All Time by Eric Stone (2005)

External links

1926 births
1989 deaths
American people of German descent
United States Navy personnel of World War II
Baseball players from Los Angeles
Major League Baseball pitchers
St. Louis Browns players
Globe-Miami Browns players
Aberdeen Pheasants players
Toledo Mud Hens players
Little Rock Travelers players
Sherbrooke Athletics players
Hawaii Islanders players
American sportspeople convicted of crimes
American people convicted of murder
People convicted of murder by California
Prisoners sentenced to life imprisonment by California
People paroled from life sentence
Sportspeople convicted of murder